The Ariel Rios Federal Building in the NoMa neighborhood of Washington, DC, is the headquarters of the United States Bureau of Alcohol, Tobacco, Firearms and Explosives (ATF) at 99 New York Avenue, NE. The building was completed in 2008, and in 2016 was named for Ariel Rios, an ATF undercover special agent who was killed in action in 1982.

The name was previously used for the ATF's old headquarters at 1200 Pennsylvania Avenue, NW, which now houses the United States Environmental Protection Agency headquarters and has been renamed the William Jefferson Clinton Federal Building.

References

Buildings of the United States government in Washington, D.C.
Bureau of Alcohol, Tobacco, Firearms and Explosives
Near Northeast (Washington, D.C.)
Government buildings completed in 2008